Parachela ingerkongi is a species of cyprinid in the genus Parachela. It inhabits Borneo and is considered harmless to humans.

References

Cyprinid fish of Asia
Cyprinidae